

Events
March 29 - The ISCM World Music Days, 2016, festival opens in Tongyeong, South Korea.
April 26 - The ABU Radio Song Festival 2016 takes place in Beijing, China, with fourteen countries participating.
May 13 - The Borneo Jazz Festival opens in Miri, Sarawak.
June 22 - Pakistani singer Amjad Sabri appears on a morning TV show in Karachi.  On his way home, his car is fired on by two motorcyclists, fatally injuring Sabri. The killing was claimed by a splinter group of the Pakistani Taliban who accused Sabri of blasphemy.
September 10 - Ah Ruem Ahn of South Korea wins the 15th International Grieg Piano Competition.
September 10-11 - Ultra Singapore took place.
October 22 - The ABU TV Song Festival 2016 took place in Bali.
December - The Turkvision Song Contest took place in Istanbul, Turkey.

Albums
Babymetal - Metal Resistance
Band-Maid - Brand New Maid
Mohsen Chavoshi - Amire Bi Gazand
Momoiro Clover Z - Hakkin no Yoake 
Exo - Ex'Act
GOT7 - Moriagatteyo
Ayumi Hamasaki - Made in Japan
Shalabee Ibrahim - Hidhaaee Noor 
Imran Mahmudul - Adhek Tumi (with Bappa Mazumder)
Nogizaka46 - Sorezore no Isu
Junko Onishi - Tea Times

Classical
 Mehmet Ali Sanlıkol - Harabat / The Intoxicated'''

Opera
 Du Yun and Royce Vavrek: Angel's BoneDeaths
January 7 - Houshang Ostovar, 88, Iranian composer.
January 9 - Cielito del Mundo, 80, Filipino singer, actress and politician
January 27 - Georgy Firtich, 77, Russian composer and pianist
February 9 - Quan Minyu, 12, Chinese singer (DIPG)
February 18 - Abdul Rashid Khan, 107, Hindustani musician
March 6 - Kalabhavan Mani, 45, Indian actor and singer (liver cirrhosis and methyl alcohol poisoning)
March 17 - Trần Lập, 42, Vietnamese rock singer (colorectal cancer)
March 18 - Adnan Abu Hassan, 57, Malaysian composer (stroke, diabetes and kidney failure)
March 23 - Gegham Grigoryan, Armenian opera singer, 65
May 2 - Balwantrai Bhatt, 94, Indian composer and musician
May 5 - Isao Tomita, 84, Japanese synthesizer musician, composer and arranger (Snowflakes Are Dancing'')
June 7 - Amber Gurung, 78, Nepalese composer, singer, and lyricist 
June 10 - Habib, 63, Iranian singer (heart attack)
June 22 - Amjad Sabri, 45, Pakistani qawwali singer (shot)
July 7 - Om Prakash Sonik, 77, Indian composer
July 30 - Mike Mohede, 33, Indonesian singer
November 3 - W. D. Amaradeva, 88, Sri Lankan violinist, singer and composer

See also 
 2016 in music
 2016 in Indian music
 2016 in Japanese music
 List of K-pop releases in 2016

References 

Asia
Asian music
2016 in Asia